Landmeister of Prussia was a high office in the Teutonic Order. The Landmeister administered the land of Prussia of the Teutonic Order. It was in existence as a separate office from 1230 to 1309, later being held in union with the office of Grand Master until 1525.

History 
The office was created at the same time as the beginning of the conquest and the forcible Christianization of the Prussians in the summer of 1230. The first Landmeister, Hermann von Balk, received the Kulmer Land from the Duke Konrad I of Masovia as the nucleus of the Teutonic Orders in Prussia and started advancing north along the Vistula river.  His successors completed the conquest of the country under considerable setbacks and established the protection of the districts and the defeat of rebellious Prussians in fortified houses, the forerunners of the later brick fortresses known as Ordensburgs. The last Landmeister of Prussia residing in Elbing was Heinrich von Plötzke. In 1309, after the death of Plötzke, the office became held in union with that of the Grand Master (held by Siegfried von Feuchtwangen residing in Marburg Castle at the time) and continued as such until 1525.

See also 
 List of Landmeisters of Prussia
 Landmeister in Livland

References

Literature 
 Theodor Hirsch, Max Toeppen, Ernst Strehlke:  Scriptores rerum Prussicarum. The historical sources of Prussian prehistory until the downfall of religious rule ; Volumes 1-5, Leipzig 1861-1874.
 Series  Sources and Studies on the History of the Teutonic Order ; so far 56 volumes, publishing house Elwert N.G.
 Hartmut Boockmann:  The German Order 12 chapters from its history ; Beck, Munich 1999, 
 German Order, Ed .:  The Order's Book: The Rules and Statutes of the Order of the Brothers and Sisters of the German House of St. Mary in Jerusalem ; 2nd ed., Verlag der Deutschen Orden, Vienna 2001
 Erich Maschke:  The German Order - Forms of its great masters ; Hamburg-Wandsbek 1935/1942, Hanseatische Verlagsanstalt AG
 Jürgen Sarnowsky:  The German Order ; Beck, Munich 2007. 
  Hermann Schreiber:  Prussia and Baltic under the Crusaders. The History of the Teutonic Order ; Casimir Katz publishing house, Gernsbach 2003, 
 Wolfgang Sonthofen:  The German Order ; Weltbild, Augsburg 1995, 
 Uwe Ziegler:  Cross and sword. The History of the Teutonic Order ; Böhlau, Cologne 2003, 
 Dieter Zimmerling:  The German Order of Knights ; Dusseldorf, Vienna, New York 1988 (ECON), 

 Teutonic Order
 West Prussia